Lightning in a Bottle (LIB) is an annual music festival in the Central Valley region of California first held in 2006. It is presented by The Do LaB, which seeks to promote sustainability, social cohesion, and creative expression. The Do LaB has also created art installations for the Coachella Valley Music and Arts Festival in Indio, California.

History
Lightning in a Bottle took their name from a private birthday party in 2000. From 2000 to 2003, the birthday celebration recurred each July as a private event. In 2004, Lightning in a Bottle Music and Art Festival was born.

In 2004, the event's co-founders and producers, who now called themselves The Do LaB, hosted Lightning in a Bottle at Gold Creek Ranch in the Angeles National Forest. After a one-year hiatus, they revived the festival in July 2006 at Live Oak Camp in Santa Barbara, California, and returned each May thereafter through 2008. However, after this eighth festival The Do LaB decided to relocate Lightning in a Bottle to accommodate the increasing attendance. Another one-year hiatus passed, and in 2010 they brought the festival to Oak Canyon Ranch in Silverado, California. In 2013, the event was moved to Lake Skinner in Winchester, California. For the first time, the event has been relocated outside of Southern California, with the 2014 festival taking place at San Antonio Reservoir Recreation Area in Bradley. in the following years of 2015 and 2016, the attendees returned to San Antonio Reservoir Recreation Area in Bradley, California.

In 2019 the Kern County Board of Supervisors unanimously approved the Lightning in a Bottle music festival.

In 2022, Lightning in a Bottle returned to Buena Vista Lake, CA.

About the festival
Lightning in a Bottle is a mix of music, art, and culture. In addition to music performances, the festival also features guest speakers, visual and interactive art installations, yoga classes, group meditation, and other attractions. Many attendees camp on-site. There are many opportunities available for volunteering at the event such as participating as a performing artist in the DoArt Foundation's Lightning in a Paintcan.

Lightning in a Bottle has won the "Outstanding Award" from A Greener Festival annually between 2011 and 2014.

In 2017, Lightning in a Bottle was nominated for Festival of the Year at the Electronic Music Awards.

See also

List of electronic music festivals
Burning Man
Counterculture
Lucent Dossier Experience
Lucidity (festival)
Silverado Canyon (Orange County)
Woogie Weekend

References

External links

The Do LaB

Music festivals established in 2000
Counterculture festivals
Music festivals in California
Transformational festivals
Electronic music festivals in the United States